Hyungdon and Daejun (Hangul: 형돈이와 대준이) is a South Korean duo under D.I. Music consisting of comedic television personalities Jung Hyung-don and Yoo Dae-jun. They debuted on May 29, 2012, with "Olympic Expressway". They released their first EP, Gangstar Rap Bloom 1, on June 5, 2012.

Discography

Extended plays

Singles

Other charted songs

References

Musical groups from Seoul
Musical groups established in 2012
2012 establishments in South Korea
South Korean musical duos